The Inter-City Intangible Cultural Cooperation Network (ICCN) is the only international organization of local governments and cultural organizations that aim to safeguard the world’s Intangible Cultural Heritage. The ICCN has been working to explore creative and effective policies for the safeguarding of local Intangible Cultural Heritage and its inseparable relation to sustainable local development. Furthermore, we aim to make cultural peace based on mutual understanding formed through intercultural dialogue.

History, Missions, and Vision

History 
The Inter-City Intangible Cultural Cooperation Network (ICCN) was established as a platform for the world-wide collaboration of local authorities for the safeguarding of the intangible cultural heritage as a vital component of sustainable development. The initiative for the creation of the ICCN was started at the first International Round Table of Mayors, in Gangneung City, Republic of Korea in 2004. As the following action, the participants of the 2008 Round Table of Mayors unanimously agreed to the official founding of the ICCN in Egypt.

2019    9th ICCN Thematic Workshop in Beit Sahour, Palestine
        Theme: “The Role of Folklore Festival in Preserving Culture and Identity” 

2018    7th ICCN General Assembly in Algemesí, Spain
        Theme: “I want to know your heritage” 

2017    8th ICCN Thematic Workshop in Beijing, China
        Theme: “Intangible Cultural Heritage and Children Education” 

2016    6th ICCN General Assembly in Sicily, Italy
        Theme: “The Intangible Heritage and the Sustainable Development processes”

2015    7th ICCN Workshop in Cachtice-Kopanice, Slovakia
        Theme: “ICH Policies to Transmit a Community’s Identity Between Generations.” 

2014	5th ICCN General Assembly/ International Women’s Forum in Isfahan, Iran
	Theme: “Safeguarding Intangible Cultural Heritage in the Process of Urbanization”
	2nd ICCN WORLD INTANGIBLE CULTURAL FESTIVAL (Isfahan, Iran)

2013    6th Thematic Workshop/3rd ICCN International Youth Forum in Dubrovnik, Croatia
        Theme: “Youth in safeguarding Intangible Cultural Heritage”

2012	4th ICCN General Assembly/ 3rd ICCN International Youth Forum in Gangneung, Korea
        Theme: “The current status of the implementation of the UNESCO 2003 Convention at a local government level and its contribution for sustainable 
        local development”
        1st ICCN WORLD INTANGIBLE CULTURAL FESTIVAL (Gangneung, Korea)

Accredited as an Advisory NGO to the Intergovernmental Committee of UNESCO (June 7)

2011    5th Thematic Workshop/2nd ICCN International Youth Forum in Gannat, France  
        Theme: “How partnership between Local governments, NGOs, and volunteers may have positive impact on ICH safeguarding activities and local 
        development?”

2010	3rd International Round Table of Mayors/ 1st ICCN Youth Forum in VLCNOV, Czech Republic
       Theme: “State/Local Government’s approach to Intangible Cultural   Heritage and the Cultural Policies of countries around the world”

2009	4th Thematic Workshop in Kingston, Jamaica
	Theme: “Local government at the forefront of preserving tour Intangible Cultural Heritage”
2008   	2nd International Round Table of Mayors in Cairo, Egypt (Official Founding of ICCN) 
       Theme: “The Role of Women in Safeguarding of Traditional Cultures and Maintenance of Cultural Diversity”

2007	3rd Thematic Workshop in Pecs, Hungary
	Theme: “Safeguarding of the Intangible Cultural Heritage by Building the Network”

2006	2nd Thematic Workshop in GANGNEUNG, Republic of Korea
	Theme: “Safeguarding of the Intangible Cultural Heritage and Participation of Young People”

2005	1st Thematic Workshop in GANGNEUNG, Republic of Korea
        Theme: “Sustainable Development, Safeguarding the Intangible Cultural Heritage and Promoting Inter-City Network”

2004   	1st International Round Table of Mayors in GANGNEUNG, Korea

Missions 
 To cooperate with local authorities/cities for equal and friendly sharing of living heritage 
 To realize the well being of communities with local culture

Vision 
 Worldwide Living Heritage celebrated and communities empowered

ICCN Activities 
 Partnership with local authorities: Joint participation of mayor and community to ICCN activities 
 International Conference on local cases in the field of the safeguarding ICH
 General Assembly (Roundtable of Mayors), Thematic Workshop 
 ICCN World Intangible Culture Festival
(1st in Gangneung, Korea, 2012/ 2nd in Isfahan, Iran, 2014)
 ICCN Youth Forum/ International Women’s forum
 Promoting dialogue and live interaction among members

ICCN Members 
1.Full Members: Full Members are accredited local authorities as represented by mayors or governors. The Full Member has the right to be represented at the ICCN meetings and events, initiate and promote the cooperative projects within ICCN.

Current Full members: 32 Local governments in 28 States 
Kingston (Jamaica), Ifugao (Philippines), Gangneung (Republic of Korea), Vlcnov (Czech Republic), Gannat (France), Kalivia (Greece), Pecs (Hungary), Monreale (Italy), Levanto (Italy), Qalyubiya (Egypt), Nishabour (Iran), Shiraz (Iran), Rosh Ha’Ayin (Israel), Nevsehir (Turkey), Isfahan (Iran), The Association of Municipalities Cachtice-Kopanice (Cachtice, Vadovce, Kostolna, Hrasne, Jablonka, Priepasne, Kosariska and Podkylava/ Slovakia), Banepa (Nepal), Dubrovnik (Croatia), Beit Sahour (Palestine), Irkutsk (Russia), Bagerhat (Bangladesh), Samarkand (Uzbekistan), Galle (Sri Lanka), Algemesí (Spain), Mangshi (China), Jeongseon (Republic of Korea), Levuka (Fiji), Valletta (Malta), Valparaiso (Chile), Xochimilco (Mexico)

2.Associate Members: Associate Members are accredited NGOs, organizations of custodians, performers and other actors of intangible cultural heritage, specialized organizations for safeguarding of the cultural heritage. Associate Members may participate in the ICCN meetings and events, and support the ICCN with their specific experiences in the related field.

Current Associate members: 25 institutes in 21 States 
Algerian Forum for the Citizenship and the Modernity (FACM, Algeria), Khmer Arts (Cambodia), Culture and Heritage Institute at Centennial College (Canada), Yiswind Institute of Multicultural Education (China), Association Nationale Cultures et Traditions (ANCT, France), Pusol Museums of School (Spain), COPPEM (Italy), Czech Ethnographical Society (Czech Republic), Artesol (Brazil), Craft Revival Trust (India), The Companion of Aria (Iran), Valencian Museum of Festivities Algemesí (Spain), Hong Kong Culture Heritage Studies and Promotion Association (China), Vietnamese Women’s Museum (Vietnam), Tropen Museum (The Netherlands), Israeli Organization of Local Authorities Culture Managers (Israel), ELEVI (Israel), Macedonian Research Society(Macedonia), Gangneung Danoje Festival Committee (Republic of Korea), Jeongseon Arirang Culture Foundation (Republic of Korea), Center for Cultural Heritage Preservation (Palestine), Dialogue Association for Culture and Creativity(Mauritania), Qatar Museums Authority(Qatar), ICH-Kuwait Committee (Kuwait), Lindjo Folklore Ensemble (Croatia)

3. Executive Board: The Executive Board is made up of 10 members (including maximum 3 associate members) and shall be elected by a majority of the ICCN Members present and voting at the General Assembly. It will perform to prepare agendas and annual actions of the ICCN and to implement other activities to administer the ICCN.

Current Board members: Gangneung (Republic of Korea), Vlcnov (Czech Republic), Monreale (Italy), Isfahan (Iran), Shiraz (Iran), Xochimilco (Mexico), Algemesi (Spain), FACM (Algeria), ANCT (France)

See also 

UNESCO
Asia-Europe Foundation

References

External links 
Cultural heritage associations: 
UNESCO (https://en.unesco.org/)
Gangneung City (http://www.gangneung.go.kr/english/ City government home page)
Korean sightseeing (http://english.visitkorea.or.kr/enu/SI/SI_EN_3_1_1_1.jsp?areaCode=32,1  Gangneung-si:Official Site of Korea Tourism Org)
Seonggyojang House (http://www.knsgj.net Seongyojang House)

Gangneung
Organizations established in 2004
Cultural organizations based in South Korea